Francis Edward de Groot (24 October 18881 April 1969) was a member of the fascist, paramilitary organisation, the New Guard of Australia, who was most famous for intervening on horseback during the official opening of the Sydney Harbour Bridge in 1932, cutting the tape before the Premier of New South Wales, Jack Lang, could do so. Earlier, he had been an antique dealer, and a maker of fine furniture and shop fittings.

Early life

Francis de Groot was born in Dublin, Ireland on 24 October 1888. He was educated at Blackrock College.

Army service
He served in the 15th Hussars on the western front in World War I, where he was awarded a ceremonial sword. Moving to Australia, he was an antique dealer and furniture manufacturer in Sydney. One of his clients was the Governor-General of Australia, Sir Isaac Isaacs, for whom he made a ceremonial chair.

Politics
He joined a fascist paramilitary organisation called the New Guard, which was politically opposed to the more left-wing government and the socialist views of the state Premier, Jack Lang. Many of the members of the New Guard were men who had served in World War I.

Sydney Harbour Bridge opening ceremony incident
He became famous when, on Saturday 19 March 1932, he upstaged Lang at the opening of the Sydney Harbour Bridge, before a crowd of 300,000 people. He was not a member of the official party but, on horseback and dressed in his military uniform, he was able to blend in with the escort party of NSW Lancers. Lang was about to cut the ribbon to formally open the bridge, when de Groot rode forward and drew his ceremonial sword, making to cut the ribbon and declare the bridge open "in the name of the decent and respectable people of New South Wales". While many accounts say de Groot succeeded in slashing the ribbon, at least one eyewitness has disputed the claim and suggested it was probably broken by the hooves of his rearing horse.

He said this was in protest that the Governor of New South Wales, Sir Philip Game, had not been invited to perform the ceremony. The Mayor of North Sydney, Hubert Primrose, an official participant at the opening ceremony, was also a member of the New Guard, but whether he was involved in planning de Groot's act is unknown. De Groot was also said to have later joined the White Army, another fascist organisation founded in Victoria in 1931.

Arrest
W.J. Mackay, Chief of the CBI pulled de Groot from his horse, arrested him, and confiscated his ceremonial sword. Initially he was taken to a small police station attached to the toll house on the Sydney Harbour Bridge. Later in the day he was sent to the Lunatic Reception House at Darlinghurst, where he was formally charged with being insane and not under proper care and control. On the same afternoon de Groot was examined by Eric Hilliard, psychiatrist and medical superintendent of Parramatta Mental Hospital, who determined that de Groot was not insane. The following day de Groot was examined by W.S. Dawson, Professor of Psychiatry at Sydney University, and by John McPherson. Both doctors found him to be completely sane.

On Monday 21 March 1932, de Groot appeared before Mr. McDougall, Stipendiary Magistrate, for the hearing of the charge of insanity. Detective Superintendent Mackay gave evidence to the effect that de Groot's actions on the Bridge were those of an insane man. Subsequently Eric Hilliard gave his opinion, based on his examination of de Groot, that de Groot was sane. The magistrate subsequently ordered de Groot's discharge from the Reception House.

Charges
De Groot was subsequently charged with three offences. The three charges brought against him were:

 Having maliciously damaged a ribbon which was the property of the Government of New South Wales to the value of £2;
 Having behaved in an offensive manner in a public place; and
 Having used threatening words to Inspector Stuart Robson in a public place.

The charges were heard on 1, 4, 5, and 6 April 1932 in the Central Police Court in Liverpool Street, Sydney before John Laidlaw, Chief Stipendiary Magistrate of New South Wales.

While the first and third charges laid against him were dismissed, the Magistrate did find de Groot guilty of offensive behaviour in Bradfield Highway – a public place. He was fined the maximum penalty of £5, with £4 in costs. The Magistrate found that "... the actions of the defendant were grossly offensive, provocative, and clearly unlawful."

Later De Groot sued the Commissioner of police for wrongful arrest, and case was eventually settled out of court with De Groot receiving damages amounting to £69/1/9.

Horse
The horse ridden by de Groot at the opening ceremony was a 16.2-hand chestnut named "Mick". The horse belonged to a Pymble schoolgirl, Margo Reichard, and was borrowed by the leader of the New Guard, Eric Campbell, from her father Albert Reichard. After the escapade, the horse was initially taken to the Mounted Police Barracks before being returned to its owner. In about 1933 the horse had a fall while being ridden by Albert Reichard, and had to be put down.

Later life
After the court case he sued for wrongful arrest on the grounds that a police officer had no right to arrest an officer of the Hussars. An out-of-court settlement was reached, and de Groot's ceremonial sword was returned to him. He later returned to Ireland, where he died on 1 April 1969.

Before his death, de Groot indicated he would like to see the sword returned to Australia. In 2004, the sword was found on a farm in County Wicklow, in the possession of de Groot's nephew. Plans were announced to have it valued and returned to Australia, possibly as a display at the National Museum of Australia. However, the Museum was outbid by Paul Cave, the founder and chairman of BridgeClimb Sydney, the tourism company that conducts climbs across the Harbour Bridge. The sword was presented to Bridge Climb Sydney by prior students of Blackrock College, De Groot's old school, during a school reunion for ex-students now living in Australia.

References

Footnotes

Bibliography

External links
 Biography  of Francis de Groot published by the Federation Press.
 Sydney Morning Herald Mystery solved: De Groot's sword to cut a dash again

15th The King's Hussars officers
1888 births
1969 deaths
Australian fascists
British Army personnel of World War I
History of Sydney
Irish emigrants to Australia (before 1923)
People educated at Blackrock College